Bengt Rosén (7 February 1936 – 3 May 2017) was a Swedish politician who served in the Riksdag from 1985 to 1994.

His father  had also served on the Riksdag. The younger Rosén was born and educated in Götene. He then moved to Skara, then studied law at Lund University. Rosén became a judge in 1963, but left his legal career to run Rosén & Söner, a company owned by his family. Rosén left the business upon his election to the Riksdag. He was reelected twice thereafter in 1988 and 1991. While a member of the Riksdag, Rosén was active in discussions of agriculture and national defense. Outside of politics, Rosén was active in Christian organizations and served as the chairman of Götene IF football club.

References

External links
Bengt Rosén profile (Riksdag)

1936 births
2017 deaths
People from Götene Municipality
Lund University alumni
Members of the Riksdag from the Liberals (Sweden)
Members of the Riksdag 1985–1988
Members of the Riksdag 1988–1991
Members of the Riksdag 1991–1994
20th-century Swedish judges